Jordi Lafebre (born 1979) is a Spanish illustrator and comic book artist active in the Franco-Belgian market.

Biography 
Lafebre was born in Barcelona. After studying drawing at the University of Barcelona and comics at the Joso School in Barcelona, he started working in 2001 as an illustrator for advertisements and various magazines in Spain (including Nobanda, Penthouse Comix and Wet Comix). In the children's magazine Mister K, he published El mundo de Judy on a script by Toni Font. His meeting with the Belgian scriptwriter Zidrou, who lives in Spain, will be decisive: with him, Jordi Lafebre drew some short stories published in Le Journal de Spirou, which would be included in two collective albums La vieille dame qui n'avait jamais joué au tennis et autres nouvelles qui font du bien (The old lady who never played tennis and other good news) and Joyeuses nouvelles pour petits adultes et grands enfants (Happy news for small adults and big children), then launch into one-shots with Lydie and La Mondaine, before starting the series Les Beaux étés (Glorious Summers).In 2020 he published the graphic novel Malgré tout ( Always never), as a writer and artist. In parallel to his career as an author, Jordi Lafebre also helps animation studios to develop their projects as a Character Designer and Visual Development Artist.

Publications 

 La vieille dame qui n'avait jamais joué au tennis autres nouvelles qui font du bien, written by  Zidrou, art by Sergio Cordoba, Monsieur H., José Homs, Maly Siri, Esther Gili, Pedro J. Colombo, Jordi Lafebre, Jordi Sampere, Laurent Van Beughen, Dupuis, 2009
 ¿Dónde van las cosas que se pierden?written by Jordi lafebre, art by Moni Pérez, Beascoa, 2010
 Joyeuses nouvelles pour petits adultes et grands enfants, written by Zidrou, art bt Alexeï Kispredilov, Denis Bodart, Édith, Frank, Mio Franco, Jordi Lafebre, Oriol, Roger, Laurent Van Beughen, Will, Dupuis, 2010
 Lydie, written by Zidrou, Dargaud, 2010
 La Mondaine, two volumes, scénario de Zidrou, Dargaud, 2014
 Les Beaux Étés (Glorious Summers), written by Zidrou, Dargaud, 2014 
 Cap au Sud, 2015
 La Calanque, 2016
 Mam'zelle Estérel, 2017
 Le Repos du guerrier, 2018
 La Fuge, 2018
 Les Genêts, 2021
 Malgré tout (Always Never), written and art by Jordi Lafebre, Dargaud, 2020

Awards 

 2010 : prix Diagonale for best album, with Zidrou, with Lydie.
 2020 : Lucca Comics fummetto dell'anno with Zidrou , with  Unestate fa 
 2021 : Prix Uderzo for the best album  Malgré tout
 2021 : Silver International Manga Award,  Malgré tout

References

External links 
 Jordi Lafebre official site
 Jordi Lafebre profile on Europe Comics

Articles with missing Wikidata information
Spanish comics artists
1979 births
People from Barcelona
University of Barcelona alumni
Living people
Artists from Barcelona